PubMeth is a database that contains information about DNA hypermethylation in cancer. It can be queried either by searching a list of genes, or cancer (sub)types.

It was created at the lab for bioinformatics and computational genomics in the Department of Molecular Biotechnology, Faculty of Bioscience Engineering at Ghent University, Belgium.

It was published in Nucleic Acids Research

References

External links
Official website

Medical databases